America by Havalina was released in 1999 on Wignalls' own label, Jackson Rubio. It is a musical tour of America by region and draws on many regional musical influences.

Track listing
 "Bovine Stomp"  – 0:53
 "American Skies"  – 3:35
 "Mexi Radio"  – 0:21
 "Puerco Chico"  – 2:52
 "Dark Skies"  – 3:10
 "Little Darl'n"  – 5:28
 "Travel Music I"  – 0:42
 "Miss. River"  – 2:33
 "Cajun Blue"  – 2:58
 "Travel Music II"  – 0:50
 "Bullfrog"  – 8:02
 "Travel Music III"  – 0:42
 "Flower Of The Desert"  – 2:33
 "Travel Music IV"  – 0:38
 "Feeling Green"  – 1:16
 "United State(s)"  – 4:40
 "Pick'n And Yodel"  – 0:49
 "Borris The Milkman"  – 3:03
 "Devil In The Cornfield"  – 6:13
 "Alaska"  – 1:12
 "Chips"  – 0:32
 "California"  – 3:05
 "Let's Not Forget Hawaii"  – 6:52
 "Keep Smil'n"  – 4:30

Personnel 
Matt Wignall - Vocals, Guitar, Lap Steel, Banjo, Mouth Harp, Harmonica
Orlando Greenhill - Electric and Upright bass, Background Vocals
Mark Cole - Percussion
Jeff Suri - Drums, Vocals, Percussion
Lori Suri - Washboard, Percussion, Background Vocals
Erick Diego Nieto - Violin, Percussion

References

1999 albums
Havalina albums